Thomas Brerewood (c.1670 - 22 December 1746), was a 'Gentleman Entrepreneur & Fraudster'. He was deeply involved in the "Pitkin Affair" of 1705, a bankruptcy fraud that was surpassed in scale only by the South Sea Bubble of 1720. Despite the disgrace which followed, Brerewood was eventually pardoned and was able to rebuild his fortune, ending his career in Maryland as a respected man of substance and importance. In 1741, Brerewood became clerk of Baltimore County, a well-remunerated position which he held until his death on December 22, 1746.

Early life 
Thomas Brerewood, who was born around 1670, was descended from a wealthy and very prominent Chester family. He was the son of Henry Brerewood, (vicar of Threekingham, Lincs. 1677-1703), and a grandson of Sir Robert Brerewood, a justice of the Court of Common Pleas during the English Civil War. He had a well-known professor, Edward Brerewood, a mayor of Chester, and a clerk of the House of Commons in his family tree. He was apprenticed to his uncle, Francis Brerewood, Treasurer of Christ's Hospital, London  in June 1686 and admitted to the Fishmongers' Company in 1699. This was one of the most prestigious of the Livery Companies and, by this time, the interests of its members were not necessarily limited to the fishing industry. Indeed, it was common for members to practise another trade entirely.

Career 
By 1705, when he was in his mid-thirties, Brerewood was already a man of considerable personal fortune. Having trained as a linen draper, or cloth merchant, he followed the money into cloth brokering and international trade. As early as 1700 he had established himself as an army regimental agent, the civilian employed by the colonel in charge of each regiment to act as paymaster and to provide uniforms. An agent earned a few hundred pounds a year in standard allowances but made his real money selling the army his cloth and lending money to officers at exorbitant rates. A single clothing assignment to a regiment might bring Brerewood thousands of pounds, and he loaned money with one hundred percent penalties for late repayment.
In the years before the Pitkin Affair broke, Brerewood served as an agent to some of the leading army commanders of the day. He was the paymaster for the Duke of Marlborough’s battalion in England while Marlborough was the commander-in-chief of the English army fighting in the Netherlands against the French during the War of the Spanish Succession (1701-1712). He also acted as agent for the regiments of the Duke of Schombergh; of Colonel Cadogen, the commander of a cavalry company; of Lieutenant-Colonel John Bristow of the First Foot Guards; and of the Duke of Northumberland, who would become Brerewood’s particular patron.
Obtaining agencies of such prominence required Brerewood to have the patronage of men of the highest rank and to have the wherewithal to bear the cost of clothing assignments for the years it took to recoup the investment from the soldiers’ off-reckonings, or the amount deducted from their pay for uniforms and equipment. Coming from a prominent family, Brerewood did not lack for either connections or wealth. He had apprenticed with his prosperous uncle, a linen draper in London. He had two houses in London: one in town and another in the village of Turnham Green on the western outskirts of the city. He also held a number of properties in Chester, including two shops in the commercial centre. He engaged in trade to continental Europe and the American colonies, and he had at least some stock investments. But this economic success did not satisfy Brerewood. From what it is known about his activities in the years before the Pitkin Affair, he moved from scam to scam, perhaps because, as counsel for Pitkin's creditors opined in testimony before the House of Lords, he “thought he was not rich enough.”,

The Pitkin Affair (1705) 
In February 1705, Thomas Pitkin met with his business partner, Thomas Brerewood, in the Swan Tavern in Cornhill, in the heart of the mercantile district of London. The men met to plot the second stage of a bankruptcy fraud that, when discovered several days later, would hit London with the force of the Bernie Madoff scandal. Although the conspirators were quickly caught, unravelling the scam required three large insolvencies and four acts of Parliament over the course of more than forty years. It had been at least nine months in the making. After the meeting, Pitkin would leave London, absconding first to Scotland and later to Holland, and setting in motion an economic panic, an international manhunt, and a reform of English bankruptcy law.

Thomas Pitkin was born in the village of Berkhamsted, Buckinghamshire in 1665. He came from a middle-class family, and had entered the trade of linen draper, or wholesale cloth merchant. By 1693 Pitkin had received the freedom of the Haberdashers Livery Company, meaning that he was a citizen of the City of London. He had his shop at the sign of the Black Spread Eagle in Kings Street, Cheapside, London. He was successful enough to have contracted a marriage  with the daughter of a wealthy merchant.
Brerewood served as the procurement agent for army regiments controlled by several of the most powerful noblemen of the day. Already man of means, he and Pitkin had done business before. Some years earlier, they had both been part of a scam known as the 'customs drawbacks system'. It was open to abuse whereby the unscrupulous could fraudulently recoup duty when they re-exported merchandise. Although Pitkin was the face of the scandal, contemporaries believed that Brerewood had masterminded the scheme in which he involved Pitkin as an effective, but perhaps not particularly enthusiastic, dupe.

The fraud itself, to the extent it can be deduced, appears to have been relatively simple. Pitkin, using at least in part money provided for the purpose by Brerewood, paid off some of his existing creditors early, giving the impression that he was flush with cash in the wake of his profitable marriage. Having acquired the reputation for wealth, Pitkin proceeded, on Brerewood's instructions, to amass a huge quantity of merchandise on credit. Estimates of his debts ranged from £50,000 to as high as £100,000. To give some sense of how large a sum that was, consider that a wealthy merchant of the time would have had an annual income of between about £400 and £600 on a capitalization of between £8,000 and £12,000.

As he acquired the goods, Pitkin secretly passed them on to Brerewood. In addition, prior to absconding, he transferred his entire estate to Brerewood so that when his creditors realized that he had fled and tried to use bankruptcy to recuperate their money, they would find nothing left to go after. The plan apparently envisioned that Brerewood, who actually held all the goods, would step forward and graciously offer to buy the debts of Pitkin's creditors for about eight shillings, six pence in the pound. The conspirators assumed that the creditors would be anxious to get something and would agree to the deal. Presumably, after quietly selling off the merchandise Pitkin had accumulated and repaying himself, Brerewood would split the remainder with Pitkin, who would be able to return to England free of liability or risk of bankruptcy.

The plan did not work out quite as intended. Pitkin's creditors learned of his absence immediately and became suspicious. When Pitkin did not return promptly, the creditors took out a commission of bankrupt, and, given the extent of the fraud and the number of creditors (later estimated to be over 140), on February 20, 1705, they also petitioned the House of Commons for a public act condemning Pitkin. In their petition they explained that they had been unable to locate any of Pitkin's assets and that if none were located, many creditors would be ruined. They wanted Parliament to address the problem that “the Laws, now in force, have not provided sufficient Remedies for the Discovery of Frauds of this Kind.” The law needed to be able to force the bankrupt to disclose and deliver his assets to his creditors. The Commons responded by creating a committee “to consider some Means to prevent the Prejudice, that happens to Trade by the fraudulent breaking of Traders, and for punishing the same.”

The resulting statute, entitled “An Act for the Relief of the Creditors of Thomas Pitkin, a Bankrupt, and for the Apprehending of him, and the Discovery of the Effects of the said Thomas Pitkin and his Accomplices,”  became law on March 14, 1705. Among other provisions, it threatened Pitkin with life imprisonment and standing in the pillory three times a year if he did not return to London and cooperate with his creditors. In the end, Pitkin had to be captured in Holland and extradited back to London, where he told his creditors all, laying the blame squarely on Brerewood. Other than spending some time in prison while assisting his creditors in fingering his partner, Pitkin never seems to have made any restitution, and at some point he was able to move to Belchamp Otten a small village in East Anglia.

Brerewood did not give up so easily. Although the creditors identified him as an accomplice and the House of Lords ordered him taken into custody in early March 1705, he still managed to salvage part of the original scam by hiring an attorney, George Wilcocks, to negotiate a composition with Pitkin's creditors. Wilcocks assured the creditors “that 8 [shillings] 6 [pence] in the Pound (£) was the utmost that Brerewood’s Estate would reach to pay,” and thereby convinced them all to sign a composition in September 1705. But the creditors eventually got wind of the fact that Brerewood held much more of the stolen assets than he had let on, and they obtained a parliamentary act against him in April 1707, making, despite the previous composition, his entire estate liable to Pitkin's debts on pain of life imprisonment and pillorying three times a year.

That was not the end of the story. Brerewood fled to Livorno, Italy, where his creditors found him in December 1707 and at great expense hauled him back to London to stand trial. He was convicted in the London criminal court in March 1709 of “Defrauding Mr. Pitkins Creditors, and Abscond[ing] contrary to an Act of Parli[a]ment made on his Account” and sentenced as the statute against him required. Yet by November he had been freed on a royal pardon after having compounded with Pitkin's creditors to pay an extra one shilling six pence in the pound over the original agreement. The London Gazette, Nov. 3, 1709, announced a composition with Pitkin creditors, who petitioned for the Pardon  of Thomas Brerewood (1709) requesting pardon by Queen in exchange for additional payment by Brerewood.

Brerewood's bankers Coggs and Dann  

This was still not the end of the story, for Brerewood had cleverly contracted with his bankers, Coggs and Dann, to pay the debt. Pitkin's creditors then went against the bankers, who ended up ruined.

John Coggs and John Dann were Goldsmiths, and, like many London Goldsmiths of the early eighteenth century, they also functioned as bankers. Coggs had, by the time of the Pitkin Affair, been a banker of prominence in the city for over forty years, during which time he had developed a reputation for reliability and caution. In 1699, his partner dying, and being himself elderly and unwell, Coggs through Huguenot connections took John Dann into the business. Around 1700, Brerewood began keeping a running account with Coggs and Dann, whose shop in the Strand was near his house on Norfolk Street. Several pieces of evidence suggest that Brerewood interacted primarily with the less experienced Dann, which might help explain how the firm became so involved in the disadvantageous process of bailing him out. In fact, Dann was a pardoned coxswain to the infamous pirate Henry Every, and joined Coggs in establishing the bank in order to legitimize his finances. The problem was that Brerewood, over £49,000, in debt to his bankers, not only owed more money to Coggs and Dann than he owed to all of the Pitkin creditors combined but also owed them more money than he could pay. They realised they could not save their business, on January 12, 1710, the bankers gave notice in the newspaper to their creditors that they had become insolvent and would stop all payments.

The identity of the creditors of the bank gives a vivid sense of how significant the bank's failure was: Lord Fitzwilliams was owed £999 and his wife £675; Sir John Holt (Lord Chief Justice) of King's Bench, was owed £500; Viscount Lanesborough was owed £2,100; Earl Lorraine was owed £5,919; the Duke of Marlborough was owed £1,268; the Duke of Norfolk was owed £872; the Duke of Newcastle was owed £1,570, and the list of proved debts goes on, running to 217 names and totalling £54,079. A broken man, John Coggs died shortly afterwards.  John Dann was astute enough to cooperate with the bank's trustees over the years in liquidating the banks assets. For this he and family received small payments from time to time from the estate. He died in 1722. Sir Francis Child, (1642–1713) of the bankers Messrs. Child & Co. with whom Coggs & Dann kept a clearing account, took over most of the business.

The strangest post-scandal story belongs, perhaps not surprisingly, to Thomas Brerewood, who is remembered (ironically) in colonial Maryland history as “a man of considerable force and integrity.” He seems to have bounced back quite well from the Pitkin debacle. Never having actually turned over quite all of his assets, Brerewood continued to lease his St. James's Square house until 1726, despite the fact that since at least 1710 the owner, Lord Ossulstone, had been trying to eject him. By 1731, he was living in Horton, Buckinghamshire, presumably in Place House, the grand home of his son, Thomas Jr. and his wife. Brerewood had been fully discharged by the 1709 composition, and he was thus permitted to rebuild his fortunes. This he seems to have done.

Family life 
In 1713, he is listed as a subscriber, alongside many noble and prominent men, to a two-volume work of Latin poetry. He seems to have educated his two sons like gentlemen and, in 1716, he married his daughter, Henrietta, to the theatre impresario John Rich (producer), the “originator of English Pantomime.” Francis Brerewood, the younger son, was a minor artist and architect. Both he and his brother, Thomas, patronized the composer George Frideric Handel; Thomas Jr. even translated his aria “Son confusa pastorella” into English. Neither son proved able to manage his affairs, however. Francis died penurious in 1781, having lived in serious financial straits for at least thirty years. Thomas Jr. was in financial difficulty by 1728. In 1738, he would take advantage of an insolvent debtor act, but before that, his father, despite the fact that he does not seem to have thought particularly highly of his son, would attempt to save him from his creditors and would, along the way, create a second career for himself.

A new career in the Colonies 
This opportunity came about because in September 1716, Thomas Jr., then in his early twenties, married Charlotte Calvert, the fourteen-year-old daughter of the fourth Lord Baltimore, Benedict Calvert, 4th Baron Baltimore. The marriage may not have been sanctioned by her family, for the couple had a clandestine wedding  in the Fleet Prison, (Fleet Marriage) which was not publicly announced until February of the following year. In July 1731, Charlotte inherited 10,000 acres in northern Maryland called My Lady's Manor. The following month, Charlotte and her husband deeded the land to Brerewood with the intent that he would use the property to pay off Thomas Jr.’s creditors, of whom Brerewood was likely the largest. In order to better organize the property, Brerewood, by then in his early sixties, went to Maryland, where he would spend the rest of his life.

He is believed to have been an innovative and successful land manager, dividing the property into lots, obtaining tenants, (whom he insisted pay their debts), and founding a short-lived town called Charlotte Town on the site of the present Monkton, Maryland. Completing his resurrection as a man of importance. In 1741, Brerewood became clerk of Baltimore County, a well-remunerated position he held until his death on December 22, 1746.

References 
 Risk and Failure in English Business 1700-1800, Julian Hoppit, Cambridge University Press, 2002  (Dr Julian Hoppit is Astor Professor of British History at University College London)
NOTE: A full list of all detailed sources are featured in "A Study of Fraud in Early English Bankruptcy" by Professor Emily Kadens, see reference [3]:

1748 deaths
18th-century English people
18th-century English poets
People from Cheshire
Year of birth uncertain
People from Monkton, Maryland
English male poets
18th-century English male writers
18th-century English writers